Robert I. Sutton (born 1954 in Chicago) is a professor of management science at the Stanford University School of Engineering and a researcher in the field of evidence-based management. He is a New York Times best-selling author.

Sutton received a Ph.D. in organizational psychology from the University of Michigan in 1984. He has been on the Stanford University faculty since 1983. He has also taught at the Haas School of Business of the University of California, Berkeley, and was a Fellow at the Center for Advanced Study in the Behavioral Sciences at Stanford during the 1986–87, 1994–95, and 2002–03 academic years. He is currently also a Fellow at the design consulting firm IDEO and has a courtesy appointment as a professor of organizational behavior at Stanford Graduate School of Business.

Books published as author 
 The Knowing-Doing Gap: How Smart Firms Turn Knowledge Into Action , with Jeffrey Pfeffer, Harvard Business School Press, 2000
 Weird Ideas That Work: 11½ Practices for Promoting, Managing, and Sustaining Innovation, The Free Press, 2002
 Hard Facts, Dangerous Half-Truths, and Total Nonsense: Profiting from Evidence-Based Management, with Jeffrey Pfeffer, Harvard Business School Press, 2006
 The No Asshole Rule: Building a Civilized Workplace and Surviving One That Isn't, Warner, 2007
 Good Boss, Bad Boss: How to Be The Best...And Learn From The Worst, Warner, 2010
 Scaling Up Excellence: Getting to More without Settling for Less , with Huggy Rao, Crown Business, 2014
 The Asshole Survival Guide: How to Deal With People Who Treat You Like Dirt, Penguin, 2017

References

External links 
 Bob Sutton: Work Matters, personal blog

1954 births
Living people
Academics and writers on bullying
American business theorists
Stanford University School of Engineering faculty
University of Michigan alumni